Underwood & Underwood was an early producer and distributor of stereoscopic and other photographic images, and later was a pioneer in the field of news bureau photography.

History
The company was founded in 1881 in Ottawa, Kansas, by two brothers, Elmer Underwood (born Fulton County, Illinois 1859 - died St. Petersburg, Florida 1947) and Bert Elias Underwood (born in Oxford, Illinois 1862 - died Tucson, Arizona 1943). They moved to Baltimore and then to New York City in 1891.

At one time, Underwood & Underwood was the largest publisher of stereoviews (also known as stereographs or stereoscopic cards), in the world, producing 10 million views a year. The Underwood brothers developed a selling system of thorough canvassing using college students. They distributed stereographs for Charles Bierstadt, J.F. Jarvis and the Littleton View Company. By 1887, they outgrew their original office in Ottawa and moved to New York City.  Offices were also opened in Canada and Europe, establishing an outlet in London at 104 High Holborn.  In 1891, Bert learned how to operate a camera and thus the firm of Underwood & Underwood Publishing entered a new merchandising sphere. By 1897, the company had a number of full-time staff and freelance photographers. In the same year, the Underwoods purchased the businesses of Jarvis; Bierstadt; and, William H. Rau.  Underwood & Underwood was publishing 25,000 stereographs a day by 1901.  The firm still canvassed and sold its own stereographs. Around 1900, Underwood & Underwood introduced boxed sets, with specific themes, such as education and religion, and travel sets depicting popular tourist areas of the world.

By 1910, Underwood & Underwood had entered the field of news photography. Due to this expansion, stereograph production was reduced until the early years of World War I. Altogether Underwood & Underwood produced between 30,000 and 40,000 stereographic titles. In 1920 stereograph production was discontinued and Underwood & Underwood sold its stereographic stock and rights to the Keystone View Company. The Keystone republished images included a V prefix for Underwood source. An example would indicate K24056 as Keystone numbered and the same images V24056 as Underwood and Keystone dual copyrighted.

In 1924-25, Underwood & Underwood took the first vertically controlled aerial photographs of the new cities of Miami and Miami Beach. Approximately 400 images were taken showing the final phase of the first building boom, which collapsed shortly after when the Great Hurricane of 1926 destroyed both locations. The quality of the images was superb for the day and rivals modern aerials in detail due to the low altitude of the aircraft taking them.  Little else is known about this aspect of the company's work.

The company ceased trading in the 1940s.

Modern appreciation of early stereoviews
Stereoviews were meant to be viewed using a stereoscope, of which there were many types. However, advances in 3D technology have allowed old stereoviews to be reproduced on digital media or the print page to be viewed using paper glasses. Anaglyph 3D is the name given to the stereoscopic 3D effect achieved by means of encoding each eye's image using filters of different (usually chromatically opposite) colours, typically red and cyan. Anaglyph 3D images contain two differently filtered coloured images, one for each eye. When viewed through the "color-coded" "anaglyph glasses", each of the two images reaches the eye it's intended for, revealing an integrated stereoscopic image. The visual cortex of the brain fuses this into perception of a three-dimensional scene or composition.

Collections 
The Smithsonian Institute holds the Underwood & Underwood Glass Stereophonic Collection that includes some 28,000 glass plates, including stereoscopic negatives, negative and positive non-stereoscopic plates used to produce lantern slides and paper prints, paper stereographs, sales catalogues and 4 stereoscopes.

Work attributed to Underwood & Underwood is held in other permanent collections, a selection of which is listed below:- 

The American University in Cairo

Art Institute of Chicago

Brigham Young University

The British Museum

Conway Library, The Courtauld Institute of Art, London

Hudson River Museum, Yonkers, NY

J. Paul Getty Museum, Los Angeles

The Metropolitan Museum of Art, New York

MoMA, New York

National Portrait Gallery, London

Science Museum, London

Victoria and Albert Museum, London

Gallery

References

External links

Sample stereographic photos
Images from World War I
 American University in Cairo Rare Books and Special Collections Digital Library Underwood & Underwood Egypt Stereoviews Collection
Underwood & Underwood. Collection 1899-1908 at the University of Chicago Special Collections Research Center

Photography companies of the United States
Companies based in Kansas
Franklin County, Kansas
Mass media companies established in 1882
1882 establishments in Kansas
American companies established in 1882